The Coat of arms of Glasgow is the official emblem of the City of Glasgow and has been in use in various forms since 1866.

History 

The Lord Lyon first granted a patent for a coat of arms for the city of Glasgow in 1866. Before this time, there were at least three official coats of arms in use.

The first seal to use all the elements associated with the coat of arms was that of the Chapter of Glasgow, in use from 1488-1540, but they did not appear in something close to their present combination until 1647.

Since it was first granted, various versions of the symbol have been in use. The current version of the coat of arms dates from April 1996, when it was granted following a local authority reshuffle.

Symbolism 
The symbols appearing on the coat of arms represents the life and legends of Saint Mungo, the patron saint of Glasgow, and are often remembered by the following poem:

The tree referred to in this poem is depicted as an Oak tree in the coat of arms, but popular versions of the story refer to a holly branch. The story goes that he was once left in charge of watching a holy fire by Saint Serf, but the fire was put out by some other boys jealous of St. Mungo after he fell asleep. Upon awakening, St. Mungo was able to miraculously light a new fire from the tree branch.

The bird referred to in the poem is a robin which was tamed by St. Mungo's teacher, St.Serf which was revived by St. Mungo after it was killed by some of his classmates.

Three fish are depicted in the coat of arms, each with a ring in its mouth. This references the story St. Mungo being able to retrieve a lost golden ring belonging to Queen Languoreth of Strathclyde from the mouth of a fish fished from the River Clyde.

The bell is an item which may have been given to St. Mungo by the Pope, but this is not known for sure. In any case St. Mungo's bell was a notable institution in Glasgow. The bell no longer exists, with a replacement having been purchased in 1641.

St. Mungo himself also appears on the coat of arms as the crest above the imagery described above, with his hand raised as if to give a benediction.

Motto on the Glasgow coat of arms 
The motto depicted on the coat of arms is "Let Glasgow Flourish". This is a shortened version of the phrase "Lord, let Glasgow flourish by the preaching of the word" which St. Mungo is said to have used within one of his sermons.

References

External links 

 City of Glasgow Crest - Local Authority page about the coat of arms
 Glasgow Coat of Arms - Gives details of usage

Glasgow
Glasgow
Glasgow
Culture in Glasgow
History of Glasgow
Coats of arms with fish
Coats of arms with birds
Coats of arms with trees
Coats of arms with bells